Charles Henry "Harry" Smyth (February 21, 1910 - September 20, 1992) was a Canadian speed skater who competed in the 1932 Winter Olympics, finishing 8th in the 5000m.

He was born in Moncton, New Brunswick.

Winner of the World Championship in 1926;

Won every race in which he competed in 1926, including the NB, Maritime, Canadian, and World Championship titles;

Winner of Canadian champion in 1926, ’27 and ’28;

Winner of the City Championship of Moncton in 1922 and ’43;

Won NB titles in 1922 (12 and under); 1926 (16 and under); 1930, ’33 (Seniors);

Winner of the Maritime Speed Skating title in 1925, ’26 and ’43;

Won the NB and Quebec titles in 1930;

Inducted into the New Brunswick Sports Hall of Fame in 1973.

External links
 Speed skating 1932  
 Sports Reference.com entry
 New Brunswick Hall of Fame entry

1910 births
1992 deaths
Canadian male speed skaters
Sportspeople from Moncton
Olympic speed skaters of Canada
Speed skaters at the 1932 Winter Olympics
20th-century Canadian people